Mawaragala Aranya Senasanaya or Mawaragala Forest Hermitage (Sinhalaː මාවරගල ආරණ්‍ය සේනාසනය) is an ancient Buddhist temple in Mahiyangana, Sri Lanka. The temple has been declared as one of archaeological sites in Sri Lanka.

History
It is believed that the history of Mawaragala Forest Hermitage is dated back to the reign of King Valagamba (103 BC and c. 89–77 BC) and arhat Maliyadeva and 60 Buddhist monks have lived here during that period.

References

Buddhist monasteries in Sri Lanka
Buddhist temples in Badulla District
Buddhist caves in Sri Lanka
Archaeological protected monuments in Badulla District